Yponomeuta strigillatus is a moth of the family Yponomeutidae. It is known from Burundi, Cameroon, Ghana,  Kenya, Mozambique, South Africa and Madagascar.

References

External links
 Swedish Museum of Natural History - pictures of typus

Yponomeutidae
Lepidoptera of Cameroon
Lepidoptera of Mozambique
Lepidoptera of South Africa
Moths of Madagascar
Moths of Sub-Saharan Africa
Lepidoptera of Burundi